Blue racer may refer to:
 the cartoon series The Blue Racer
 a subspecies of racer snake, Coluber constrictor foxii
 Marion Blue Racers, the defunct indoor football team